The 2016 season is Incheon United's twelfth season in the K-League in South Korea. Incheon United competed in the K League Classic and the Korean FA Cup.

Current squad

Out on loan

Transfers

In

Out

Youth coaching staff

Match results

K League Classic
All times are Korea Standard Time (KST) – UTC+9

League table

Results summary

Results by round

Korean FA Cup

Squad statistics

Appearances

Goals

Assists

Discipline

References

South Korean football clubs 2016 season
2016